"It Might Be You" is a song with music written by Dave Grusin, and lyrics written by Alan & Marilyn Bergman. It was performed by singer/songwriter Stephen Bishop in the 1982 film Tootsie starring Dustin Hoffman and Jessica Lange. The song was nominated for an Academy Award for Best Original Song in 1983.

Bishop's recording peaked at No. 25 on the Billboard Hot 100 chart on May 7, 1983, and spent eight weeks in the Top 40, becoming his final Top 40 song to date. It also spent two weeks at No. 1 on the U.S. adult contemporary chart in April the same year.

Chart performance

Weekly charts

Year-end charts

Personnel
Stephen Bishop - vocals
Dave Grusin – electric piano, acoustic piano
George Doering, Paul Jackson Jr., Mitch Holder - guitar
Abraham Laboriel - bass
Ian Underwood - synthesizer
Carlos Vega - drums
Steve Foreman - percussion
Becky Porter, Billy Phedford, Marva Holcolm, Paulette Brown - backing vocals

Notable cover versions
 In 1995, Roberta Flack recorded the song for use in the Forest Whitaker-directed film, Waiting to Exhale. The song appears in the film, but not on the film's soundtrack album and appearing instead on her own Roberta.
 Filipino singer Erik Santos also revived and covered the song as a duet with Marinel Santos in 2003 and it was used as the theme song of the Philippine drama series, It Might Be You.
 In 2013, the song appeared over the closing credits of the film The Pretty One, covered by K A R Y Y N and Julian Wass. The Pretty One shares with Tootsie the theme of a person assuming a different identity.
In October 2015, Filipino singer and actor Michael Pangilinan covered the song and it was used as the theme song of the movie Everyday I Love You.

See also
List of number-one adult contemporary singles of 1983 (U.S.)

References

Whitburn, Joel (1996). The Billboard Book of Top 40 Hits, 6th Edition (Billboard Publications)

External links
 

1983 singles
1982 songs
Stephen Bishop (singer) songs
Songs with lyrics by Alan Bergman
Songs with lyrics by Marilyn Bergman
Songs with music by Dave Grusin
Rock ballads
Songs written for films
1980s ballads
Warner Records singles